Persea nudigemma is a species of plant in the family Lauraceae, commonly known as laurel. It is a flowering, leafy plant endemic to subtropical or tropical moist montane forests in Ecuador.

References

nudigemma
Flora of Ecuador
Vulnerable plants
Taxonomy articles created by Polbot